Phlox subulata the creeping phlox, moss phlox, moss pink or mountain phlox, is a species of flowering plant in the family Polemoniaceae, native to eastern and central USA, and widely cultivated.

The odor given off by the plants may be mistaken for that of marijuana.

Description
The small, five-petaled flowers bloom in rose, mauve, blue, white, or pink in late spring to early summer.

Taxonomy
The Latin specific epithet subulata means awl- or needle-shaped.

Cultivation
The plant is cultivated as a front-of-border or groundcover plant.

Cultivars
The following cultivars have received the Royal Horticultural Society's Award of Garden Merit:
'Kelly's Eye' (pink)
'McDaniel's Cushion' (deep pink)
'Red Wings' (carmine red)

Uses
The Native American Mahuna people use the plant internally for rheumatism.

See also 
Phlox stolonifera

References

 
Bay Books. P. 2005. The A-Z of Garden Flowers.

External links

subulata
subulata
Flora of Kentucky
Flora of Tennessee
Flora of New York (state)
Plants described in 1753
Taxa named by Carl Linnaeus
Plants used in traditional Native American medicine
Perennial plants
Flora without expected TNC conservation status